Triple Glaciers are in Grand Teton National Park, Wyoming, United States. The glaciers are disconnected from each other and occupy three separate cirques on the northwest face of Mount Moran and northeast of Thor Peak. The glaciers are unofficially referred to as East, Middle and West Triple Glacier.

References

See also
 List of glaciers in the United States
 Geology of the Grand Teton area

Glaciers of Grand Teton National Park